Follow This is an American documentary television series produced by BuzzFeed. The show was released on Netflix on August 23, 2018. Netflix ordered 20 episodes, initially releasing the first seven episodes in August 2018, with seven more in September and six more in November. Each episode of the show focuses on a different topic, with episode subjects including intersex, men's rights, and ASMR. Episodes are hosted by BuzzFeed reporters. The series was not renewed for a second season.

Hosts 
 John Stanton
 Scaachi Koul
 Azeen Ghorayshi
 Bim Adewunmi
 Juliane Löffler
 Charlie Warzel

Episodes

Part 1 (2018)

Part 2 (2018)

Part 3 (2018)

References

External links 
 
 

Netflix original documentary television series
BuzzFeed
2018 American television series debuts
2018 American television series endings
2010s American documentary television series
English-language Netflix original programming